Dissen may refer to:

Dissen (surname), a list of people with the surname Dissen
Dissen, Lower Saxony, a town in Germany
Dissen, a quarter (Ortsteil) in the municipality of Dissen-Striesow, Brandenburg, Germany
Dissen, Franklin County, Missouri, an unincorporated community in the United States
Dissen, Cape Girardeau County, Missouri, an unincorporated community in the United States